The year 2021 was the 18th year in the history of the Konfrontacja Sztuk Walki, a mixed martial arts promotion based in Poland. 2021 will begin with KSW 58.

Background
Martin Lewandowski announced that KSW has plans studio events for the first 6 months of 2021 due to the COVID-19 pandemic.
KSW has plans for a reality TV show. He also announced the plans for a European expansion in 2021.

List of events

KSW 58: Parnasse vs. Torres

'KSW 58: Parnasse vs. Torres' was a mixed martial arts event held by Konfrontacja Sztuk Walki January 30, 2021 at the Wytwórnia Club in Łódź, Poland.

Background
KSW 58 was headlined by a title fight between the KSW Featherweight champion Salahdine Parnasse and the challenger Daniel Torres. In the co-main event, a light heavyweight fight between the Olympic gold medalist Szymon Kolecki and the veteran Martin Zawada.

The card also featured a welterweight bout between Michał Michalski and Mirko cro cop protege Aleksandar Rakas. As well, the former Titan FC Welterweight Champion Uroš Jurišić made his KSW debut against Shamil Musaev who moved up welterweight for this fight.

Former Glory and UFC fighter Guto Inocente made his debut against the former KSW Heavyweight title challenger Michał Andryszak.

Francisco Albano Barrio has face Bartłomiej Kopera in a lightweight bout.

Paweł Polityło has fought Dawid Martynik in the sole bantamweight bout of the card.

The undefeated featherweight prospect Robert Ruchała made his sophomore appearance against the promotional newcomer Danijel Bažant.

Bonus awards

The following fighters were awarded bonuses:
 Fight of the Night: Shamil Musaev vs. Uroš Jurišić
 Knockout of the Night: Daniel Torres
 Submission of the Night: Robert Ruchała

Results

KSW 59: Fight Code

'KSW 59: Fight Code' was a mixed martial arts event held by Konfrontacja Sztuk Walki March 20, 2021 at the Wytwórnia Club in Łódź, Poland.

Background
In the main event of the evening the former World's Strongest Man Mariusz Pudzianowski was set to return after a fifteen month layoff against the undefeated Senegalese heavyweight Serigne Ousmane. However, on the day of the fight, Ousmane Dia suffered an acute appendicitis attack and had to be hospitalized.  Stepping in on just a few hours notice was Serbia's Nikola Milanovic.

The event co-headliner featured a rematch, Antun Račić made the second defense of his  the KSW Bantamweight title against Sebastian Przybysz. Račić won the first bout at KSW 46 via unanimous decision.

Former FFC Heavyweight champion Darko Stošić returned to heavyweight after an unsuccessful stint in UFC light heavyweight division. In his first fight in KSW the Serbian faced the polish Michał Włodarek.

A middleweight fight between the Olympic medalist Damian Janikowski and the Bellator veteran Jason Radcliffe was part of the event.

Michal Pietrzak faced the 26 year-old prospect Krystian Kaszubowski in a welterweight bout, as well as welterweight bout between Lionel Padilla and the undefeated Adrian Bartosiński,  

The Rajewski brothers will be back on the same card. The six-fight KSW veteran Łukasz Rajewski is scheduled to fight the undefeated welterweight Mateusz Legierski, in what will be his sophomore appearance with the organization. Legierski later withdrew from the bout for undisclosed reasons, and was replaced by Konrad Dyrschka. Sebastian Rajewski joins brother on the card as he will fight Savo Lazić in the event opener.

The Opening bout featured a featherweight bout between the debuting Cyprian Wieczorek and Patryk Likus.

Bonus awards

The following fighters were awarded bonuses:
 Fight of the Night: Sebastian Przybysz vs. Antun Račić
 Knockout of the Night: Darko Stošić

Results

KSW 60: De Fries vs. Narkun 2

'KSW 60: De Fries vs. Narkun 2' was a mixed martial arts event held by Konfrontacja Sztuk Walki April 24, 2021 at the Wytwórnia Club in Łódź, Poland.

Background
The event was headlined by a rematch between Phil De Fries and Tomasz Narkun. The pair previously met on March 23, 2019 in the main event at KSW 47: The X-Warriors, where De Fries defeated Narkun by unanimous decision and defended his KSW heavyweight title.

In the co-main event, the reigning KSW Lightweight champion Marian Ziółkowski was scheduled to make his first title defense against Maciej Kazieczko. 	

The former boxer Izu Ugonoh was scheduled to make his sophomore MMA appearance against the undefeated heavyweight prospect Thomas Narmo, but Narmo was forced off the card on March 6 with an rib injury. The undefeated German Uğur Özkaplan was set to serve as Narmo's replacement. In turn, Özkaplan was replaced by Marek Samociuk.

Tomasz Jakubiec was scheduled to fight Aleksandar Ilić at middleweight, with both fighters coming off of losses.

Vojto Barborík was scheduled to make his promotional debut against Krzysztof Klaczek.

Ion Surdu and Kacper Koziorzębski were scheduled to fight in a 80kg catchweight bout.

The opening bout featured a bantamweight fight between Patryk Surdyn and Jakub Wikłacz.

Bonus awards

The following fighters were awarded bonuses:
 Fight of the Night: Patryk Kaczmarczyk vs. Michał Sobiech
 Knockout of the Night: Ion Surdu
 Submission of the Night: Vojto Barborík

Results

KSW 61: To Fight or Not To Fight

'KSW 61: To Fight or Not To Fight' was a mixed martial arts event held by Konfrontacja Sztuk Walki June 5, 2021 at the Ergo Arena in Gdańsk, Poland. The event was planned to be held at the Gdańsk Shakespeare Theatre. However, the event was moved to the Ergo Arena in Gdansk. On May 10 it was announced fans will be able to attend the event, KSW 61 will operate at a 50% capacity due to government guidelines.

Background
The main event featured a heavyweight bout between the former World's Strongest Man Mariusz Pudzianowski and KSW 1 tournament winner Łukasz Jurkowski.

Tomasz Romanowski was scheduled to fight Patrik Kincl in a welterweight bout.

A featherweight bout between Filip Pejić and the former KSW Featherweight champion Salahdine Parnasse was scheduled for the event.

Two former KSW Light-heavyweight title challengers, Przemysław Mysiala and Ivan Erslan, were scheduled to face each other.

Roman Szymański was scheduled to fight Donovan Desmae in a lightweight bout. Adam Niedźwiedź and Jakub Kamieniarz were likewise scheduled to face each other in a lightweight bout.

A heavyweight bout between the former KSW title contender Michal Kita and the UFC veteran Jay Silva  was scheduled for the event. Jay Silva later withdrew from the bout, for undisclosed reasons, and was replaced by Darko Stošić.

Karolina Owczarz was scheduled to fight Monika Kucinic at strawweight in the sole WMMA bout of the event.

Bonus awards

The following fighters were awarded bonuses:
 Fight of the Night: Roman Szymański vs. Donovan Desmae
 Knockout of the Night: Darko Stošić
 Submission of the Night: Salahdine Parnasse

Results

KSW 62: Kołecki vs. Szostak

KSW 62: Kołecki vs. Szostak was a mixed martial arts event held by Konfrontacja Sztuk Walki on July 17, 2021 at the ATM studio in Warsaw, Poland.

Background
The event was headlined by a light heavyweight bout between Szymon Kołecki and Akop Szostak.

Michał Michalski was scheduled to face the undefeated Adrian Bartosiński in a welterweight bout.

Former kickboxer Tomasz Sarara made his mixed martial arts debut against Vladimir Toktasynov. The two of them fought in 2012, under kickboxing rules, with Toktasynov winning by decision.

A lightweight bout between Sebastian Rajewski and the former KSW featherweight champion Artur Sowiński was announced for the event.

One-time bantamweight title challenger Bruno Augusto dos Santos was scheduled to fight Paweł Polityka.

A bantamweight bout between David Martinik and Lemmy Krušič was announced for the event.

Bonus awards

The following fighters were awarded bonuses:
 Fight of the Night:  Sebastian Rajewski vs. Artur Sowiński
 Knockout of the Night: Andrzej Grzebyk
 Submission of the Night: Lom-Ali Eskijew

Results

KSW 63: Crime of The Century 

KSW 63: Crime of The Century was a mixed martial arts event held by Konfrontacja Sztuk Walki on September 4, 2021 at the ATM studio in Warsaw, Poland.

Background
The event will feature a title fight between the reigning KSW Welterweight champion Roberto Soldić and the challenger Patrik Kincl as the event headliner.

The co-main event will feature Greco-Roman Olympic bronze medalist wrestler Damian Janikowski and the former UFC fighter Paweł Pawlak who makes his KSW debut.

The heavyweight contender Darko Stošić will fight against Michał Andryszak at the event.

Also, a two Croatian bout is scheduled for the event. First, the former KSW Bantamweight champion Antun Račić is scheduled to face Jakub Wikłacz in a bantamweight bout and in a 80 kg catchweight bout between Aleksandar Rakas will face Tomasz Romanowski.

Two women's flyweight bouts were scheduled for the event. First, Emilia Czerwińska would face Weronika Esze, while Sara Luzar Smajić would face Aitana Alvarez.

The bout between Armen Stepanyan  and Michał Domin  will serve as the opening fight.

Bonus awards

The following fighters were awarded bonuses:
 Fight of the Night: Paweł Pawlak vs. Damian Janikowski
 Submission of the Night: Jakub Wikłacz
 Knockout of the Night: Tomasz Romanowski

Results

KSW 64: Przybysz vs. Santos 

KSW 64: Przybysz vs. Santos was a mixed martial arts event held by Konfrontacja Sztuk Walki on October 23, 2021 at the Atlas Arena in Łódź, Poland.

Background
A bantamweight title fight between the reigning champion Sebastian Przybysz and challenger Bruno Augusto dos Santos was announced as the main event.

A heavyweight bout between Serigne Ousmane Dia and five-time World's Strongest Man titlist Mariusz Pudzianowski was scheduled as the co-main event. The two were originally set to fight at KSW 59, before Dia withdrew.

KSW veteran Filip Pejić was scheduled to face promotional newcomer Daniel Rutkowski in a featherweight bout.

A featherweight bout between Robert Ruchała and Patryk Kaczmarczyk was announced for the event. The two of them fought as amateurs, at Thunderstrike Fight League 15 on October 20, 2018, with Kaczmarczyk winning by unanimous decision.

A welterweight bout between Michał Pietrzak and Shamil Musaev was scheduled for the event.

Two middleweight bouts were announced for the event: Cezary Kęsik was scheduled to face Marcin Krakowiak, while Albert Odzimkowski was scheduled to face Jason Radcliffe.

A women's flyweight bout between Karolina Owczarz and Sylwia Juśkiewicz was scheduled for the event.

Bonus awards

The following fighters were awarded bonuses:
 Fight of the Night: Cezary Kęsik vs. Marcin Krakowiak 
 Submission of the Night: Sebastian Przybysz
 Knockout of the Night: Daniel Rutkowski

Results

KSW 65: Khalidov vs. Soldić 

KSW 65: Khalidov vs. Soldić was a mixed martial arts event held by Konfrontacja Sztuk Walki on December 18, 2021 at Gliwice Arena in Gliwice, Poland.

Background
The event featured two title fight, first a KSW Middleweight Championship bout between the reigning champion Mamed Khalidov and the KSW Welterweight Champion Roberto Soldić as the event headliner. Secondly, a rematch for the KSW Featherweight Championship between the champion Daniel Torres and the former Champion Salahdine Parnasse as the event co-headliner. Daniel Torres came in at 146 pounds, a pound over championship weight and was stripped of the title, only Parnasse was able to win the belt.

On December 5, it was announced that Ion Surdu had suffered a injury in training and was pulling out of his bout with Adam Niedźwiedź. Surdu was replaced by Miroslav Brož against Niedźwiedź.

A featherweight bout between Patryk Likus and Luke Santarelli was expected to take place at this event. On December 10, Santarelli withdrew due to an injury and was replaced by Alexander Lööf. However, in  turn, Lööf has to withdraw on december 16, he was replaced by Hassan Shaaban who steps in on just a few days notice to make his KSW debut against Likus. Hassan Shaaban in turn missed weight and was replaced by Piotr Olszynka.

Bonus awards

The following fighters were awarded bonuses:
 Fight of the Night: Lom Ali Eskiev vs. Damian Stasiak
 Submission of the Night: Damian Piwowarczyk
 Knockout of the Night: Patryk Likus, Roberto Soldić

Results

See also
 List of current KSW fighters
 2021 in UFC
 2021 in Bellator MMA
 2021 in ONE Championship
 2021 in Absolute Championship Akhmat
 2021 in Rizin Fighting Federation
 2021 in Legacy Fighting Alliance
 2021 in RXF

References

External links
KSW

2021 in mixed martial arts
Konfrontacja Sztuk Walki events
Konfrontacja Sztuk Walki events
2021 sport-related lists